Brandon Scherff (born December 26, 1991) is an American football guard for the Jacksonville Jaguars of the National Football League (NFL). He played college football at Iowa and was drafted by the Washington Redskins in the first round of the 2015 NFL Draft, where he played seven seasons and made five Pro Bowls before joining the Jaguars in 2022. Scherff is considered to be among the best guards in the NFL.

High school career 
A native of Denison, Iowa, Scherff attended Denison High School, where he was a two-way lineman, earning first-team all-state honors on offense as a senior after earning second-team all-state on defense as a junior. As a sophomore, he played quarterback, passing for 1,200 yards on the season. Scherff’s high school coach was Dave Wiebers. He also played basketball, where he led the state in rebounds as a senior, and baseball, where he helped his team qualify for the state tournament as a junior.

Scherff was also on the school's track & field team, where he was a standout shot putter and discus thrower, earning All-State recognition. He won two state titles in the shot put as a sophomore and a senior, placed third as a freshman and second as a junior. He won the shot put event at the 2010 Drake Relays, recording a career-best throw of 18.77 meters, setting a school record. At the 2010 Iowa State T&F Championships, he placed third in the discus throw, with a personal-best throw of 48.95 meters.

Regarded as a three-star recruit by Rivals.com, Scherff was ranked as the No. 44 offensive tackle prospect in 2010. He committed to Iowa over offers from Iowa State, Kansas, Kansas State, Missouri, and Nebraska.

College career 

After redshirting his initial year at Iowa, Scherff saw action at left guard in eleven games on the season, starting three. In his sophomore year, he replaced Riley Reiff as the starting left tackle. He started first seven games of season at left tackle before suffering a broken fibula and a dislocated ankle in game seven, and  missed the remainder of the season due to injury.

Despite being regarded one of the best offensive lineman prospects for the NFL draft after his junior year at Iowa, Scherff decided to return for his senior year. He received his B.A. degree in Leisure studies in December 2014. After the 2014 season, Scherff was awarded the Outland Trophy as the country's best interior lineman.

Professional career

Washington Redskins / Football Team 
Coming out of Iowa, Scherff was projected by the majority of analysts and scouts to be selected in the first round. He was ranked as the best offensive tackle in the draft by NFLDraftScout.com, the top interior lineman by Mike Mayock, the best offensive lineman and guard by Lance Zierlein, and top offensive tackle by Sports Illustrated. Scherff received an invitation to the NFL Combine and completed the bench press and 40, 20, and 10-yard dash. Due to a hamstring injury, he was not able to finish the entire combine. On March 23, 2015, he participated at Iowa's Pro Day and completed the drills he was unable to perform at the combine. Along with the bench, he did the vertical, broad, shuttle, and 3-cone drill. By the time the draft was approaching, he was considered a top 10 overall pick. Many scouts and analysts were conflicted over his future position in the NFL, split on whether he was better suited to play offensive tackle or guard.

The Washington Redskins selected Scherff in the first round (fifth overall) of the 2015 NFL Draft. This made him the first player from Iowa drafted in the top ten since Robert Gallery was selected second overall in 2004. On May 12, 2015, Scherff signed a fully guaranteed four-year, $21.21 million contract with the team.

He entered training camp competing with Morgan Moses for the starting right tackle position but was moved to right guard prior to the beginning of the regular season. Since he was able to handle bull rushes well, he was thought to better suit the right guard position and be responsible for a smaller area where his power would be more useful. Offensive line coach Bill Callahan named him the Redskins’ starting right guard to begin the season after winning the job over Spencer Long in the preseason.

Scherff made his professional debut in the Redskins' season-opening 17-10 loss to the Miami Dolphins. He started all 16 regular season games, played 752 snaps, and helped the Redskins finish first in the NFC East with a 9-7 record. In January 2016, he started his first career postseason game, as the Redskins were routed by the Green Bay Packers in the NFC Wildcard game 35-18. Scherff finished his second season starting in all 16 regular season games, and due to his highly regarded performance that year, he was voted to the 2017 Pro Bowl, his first such vote. He was also voted to the 2018 Pro Bowl the following year.

On April 16, 2018, the Redskins picked up the fifth-year option on Scherff's contract. On November 5, he was placed on injured reserve after suffering a torn pectoral in Week 9. For the 2019 season, Scherff was voted to his third Pro Bowl. The same day, the Redskins placed Scherff on injured reserve due to elbow and shoulder injuries.

An impending free agent in 2020, the team placed the non-exclusive franchise tag on Scherff prior to the start of the new league year, with him agreeing to it on April 8, 2020. He was placed on injured reserve on September 22 following a MCL sprain he suffered during a Week 2 game against the Arizona Cardinals before being reactivated on October 16, 2020. He was named to the 2021 Pro Bowl, his fourth in his career, as well becoming the first Washington player to be named first-team All-Pro since punter Matt Turk in 1996. He was also ranked 98th on the NFL Top 100 Players of 2021 list.

In March 2021, Washington placed another non-exclusive franchise tag on Scherff, worth $18 million, which he signed days later. He was placed on the team's COVID-19 reserve list on July 31, 2021, and was activated on August 5. In the Week 4 game against the Atlanta Falcons, Scherff left the game in the second quarter due to a MCL sprain. He missed the Week 15 and 16 games against the Philadelphia Eagles and Dallas Cowboys after being placed on the COVID-19 reserve list for a second time on December 20, 2021. A week later, Scherff was placed back on the active roster.

Jacksonville Jaguars
Scherff signed a three-year, $49.5 million contract with the Jacksonville Jaguars on March 16, 2022.

Personal life 
Scherff is a life-long Lutheran who regularly contributes autographed memorabilia for fundraisers for his Lutheran grade school.

References

External links 

Jacksonville Jaguars bio
Iowa Hawkeyes bio

1991 births
Living people
American football offensive tackles
American football offensive guards
Iowa Hawkeyes football players
Players of American football from Iowa
People from Denison, Iowa
All-American college football players
Washington Redskins players
Washington Football Team players
Jacksonville Jaguars players
National Conference Pro Bowl players
American Lutherans
Lutheran Church–Missouri Synod people
Ed Block Courage Award recipients